Dainkwan is a village panchayat located in the tehsil Nurpur, and district Kangra.

The surrounding nearby villages are Sanour, Thakurdwara, Tappa, Milwan, Kathgarh, Paral, Kursan, Gadhrana, Indora, Basantpur, Indpur, Makroli, Bhapoo, Raja khas, Madholi, Dah Kuhlara, Chhanni, Ghoran, Bhalakh, Dagla, Majra, Surajpur, Mangwal, Mohtli, Baleer, Sirat, Gangath, Rit Upperli   Belimahanta, Gagwal, Lodhwan, Branda, Kandwal, Bakrarwan, Miani, Ghandran, Chaloh, Atara, Joki, Kandwal, Kangrari, Malhari, Gangath, Seikhpura, Surdwan, and Ulherian.

The native language of Dainkwan is Hindi.

The village is located in the UTC 5.30 time zone and it follows Indian Standard Time. Dainkwan sunrise time varies 24 minutes from Indian Standard Time. Vehicles drive on the left side of the road. Dainkwan people use the Indian rupee for currency.

Dainkwan phones and mobiles can be accessed by adding the Indian country dialing code +91 from abroad.  Dainkwan domain name extension (country code top-level domain is .in.

References

External links 
 
 
 

Villages in Kangra district